James J. Martin  (born December 29, 1960) is an American Jesuit priest, writer, and editor-at-large of the Jesuit magazine America. In 2017, Pope Francis appointed Martin as a consultant to the Vatican's Secretariat for Communications. A New York Times Best Selling author, Martin's books include The Jesuit Guide to (Almost) Everything: A Spirituality for Real Life, Jesus: A Pilgrimage, and My Life With the Saints. He is a sought-after public speaker and media commentator on subjects such as the life and teachings of Jesus and Ignatian spirituality as inspired by the life and teachings of Saint Ignatius of Loyola.

Martin's outreach to the LGBT community has drawn both support and condemnation from within the Catholic Church. This is the subject of his book Building a Bridge: How the Catholic Church and the LGBT Community Can Enter into a Relationship of Respect, Compassion, and Sensitivity. In 2021, a documentary film about Martin's LGBT ministry, also called Building a Bridge, premiered at the Tribeca Film Festival in New York City.

Education, career and early ministry
Martin grew up in Plymouth Meeting, Pennsylvania, United States, and attended Plymouth-Whitemarsh High School. He received his bachelor's degree in economics  from the University of Pennsylvania's Wharton School of Business in 1982 and was employed at General Electric in New York City and later at GE Capital in Stamford, Connecticut.

Dissatisfied with the corporate world, and after viewing a documentary on the life of Trappist monk Thomas Merton, Martin became more deeply involved in the Catholic Church and entered the Society of Jesus (more commonly known as the Jesuits) in August 1988. During his studies to become a Jesuit priest, Martin earned a M.A. in philosophy from Loyola University Chicago in 1994, a M.Div. from the Weston Jesuit School of Theology in 1998, and a Th.M., also from the Weston School, in 1999. He was ordained a priest in June 1999. His activity for LGBTQ people was intensified after the 2016 Pulse shooting which caused 49 deaths at a gay nightclub in Orlando, Florida.

In addition to his work at America magazine, Martin has written or edited more than a dozen books on religious and spiritual topics.  He is a frequent commentator for CNN, NPR, Fox News Channel, Time magazine, The Huffington Post, and other news outlets, and has written several op-ed pieces and blogged for The New York Times. In September 2019, Martin met privately with Pope Francis at the Vatican to discuss the pastoral care of LGBT Catholics.

Media ventures

Television appearances
On September 13, 2007, Martin appeared on Comedy Central's The Colbert Report to discuss Mother Teresa's fifty-year sense of abandonment by God which had much coverage in the media at the time.  Martin appeared several more times on The Colbert Report, once to discuss Pope Benedict XVI's visit to the U.S. in April 2008, and again on February 23, 2009, to discuss how poverty (or, at least, reducing the importance one places on material goods) can bring one closer to God.

On March 18, 2010, Martin was invited to the program in the wake of Glenn Beck's suggestion that Catholics run away from priests who preach "social justice". Martin said that "social justice addresses the things that keep people poor" and "asks you why are these people poor." He added that "Christ asked us to work with the poor. ... In the Gospel of Matthew He says that the way that we're going to be judged at the end of our lives is not what church we prayed in or how we prayed but really ... how we treated the poor."  On August 10, 2011, Martin appeared on The Colbert Report to discuss God's "approval rating" and to promote his book The Jesuit Guide to (Almost) Everything: A Spirituality for Real Life. On November 9, 2011, he appeared once again to promote his book concerning humor and religion, Between Heaven and Mirth. On February 11, 2013, he went on the show to discuss the resignation of Pope Benedict XVI. On September 24, 2013, he was on the show, talking about an interview where Pope Francis said that love, compassion, and mercy are more important than the rules (within a subtext of Pope Francis washing the feet of criminals, wanting a more prominent role for women, saying atheists can be redeemed, not judging gays and lesbians, and that we cannot serve money and God at the same time), and introducing Metallica. On September 24, 2013, he appeared to discuss income inequality and the Pope's emphasis on economic justice and on the importance of caring for the poor.

The Democratic National Convention asked Martin to deliver a closing prayer at their 2020 convention.

Theatre and film
Martin is a member of the LAByrinth Theater Company. His involvement with the 2005 stage production of The Last Days of Judas Iscariot, written by Stephen Adly Guirgis, directed by Philip Seymour Hoffman, and featuring Sam Rockwell, John Ortiz, Eric Bogosian, and Callie Thorne, is the subject of Martin's book A Jesuit Off-Broadway: Center Stage with Jesus, Judas, and Life's Big Questions (Loyola Press, 2007). Publishers Weekly gave the book a starred review. Martin appeared as a priest, performing two baptisms, in Martin Scorsese's  2019 crime film The Irishman.

In 2021, a documentary film about Martin's LGBT ministry, called "Building a Bridge," directed by Evan Mascagni and Shannon Post and with Martin Scorsese as executive producer, premiered at the Tribeca Film Festival in New York City.

Critique of anti-Catholicism in the media
Martin has written about anti-Catholicism in the entertainment industry. He argues that, despite an irresistible fascination with the Catholic Church, the entertainment industry also holds what he considers obvious contempt for the Catholic Church.  He suggests: "It is as if producers, directors, playwrights and filmmakers feel obliged to establish their intellectual bona fides by trumpeting their differences with the institution that holds them in such thrall."

Pilgrimages
At the recommendation of Drew Christiansen SJ, the then editor of America, Martin undertook a pilgrimage to the Holy Land, which he then chronicled in his book Jesus: A Pilgrimage.  The book quickly became a New York Times bestseller and Christopher Award winner, and received positive reviews from a number of public figures including author Scott Hahn, Cardinal Timothy M. Dolan, and Archbishop Desmond Tutu. Beginning in 2015, Martin has led a number of pilgrimages to the Holy Land with America Media, inspired by the book and visiting many of the religious sites described therein.

LGBTQ+ issues 
Following the 2016 Orlando nightclub shooting, Martin stated that he was "disappointed that more Catholic leaders did not offer support to the LGBT community" in the aftermath of the shooting, and started a series of lectures on how the Church could better minister to LGBT Catholics, which led to his book, Building a Bridge (2017).

The book was hailed by several prelates, including Bishop Robert McElroy as well as Cardinals Kevin Farrell and Joseph Tobin. Tobin wrote that "in too many parts of our Church LGBT people have been made to feel unwelcome, excluded, and even shamed. Father Martin's brave, prophetic, and inspiring new book marks an essential step in inviting Church leaders to minister with more compassion, and in reminding LGBT Catholics that they are as much a part of our Church as any other Catholic."

However, Martin's book also received criticism from some conservative-leaning Catholics who successfully lobbied for many of his lectures at Catholic venues to be cancelled. In a critique of the book, Cardinal Robert Sarah described Martin as "one of the most outspoken critics of the Church's message with regard to sexuality". In 2018, Cardinal Raymond Burke stated that Martin has "an 'open' and wrong position on homosexuality".

Martin himself lauded Sarah's column as "a step forward", since Sarah used the term "'L.G.B.T.',  which a few traditionalist Catholics reject", rather than phrases such as “persons with same-sex attraction” or "sodomites."

Journalist Frank Bruni said that Martin did not "explicitly reject Church teaching" but rather questioned the language in the Catechism of the Catholic Church that describes homosexual attraction as "intrinsically disordered". In a column, Martin wrote that he has never challenged the Church's teaching on homosexuality and never will. Some critics have said that nowhere in his book has Martin affirmed the Church's magisterial teaching to be true. Princeton professor Robert George, co-author of What Is Marriage? Man and Woman: A Defense, argued that Catholics should accept that Martin believes in the Church's teaching on homosexuality.

Archbishop Charles Chaput of Philadelphia stated that "due to the confusion caused by his statements and activities regarding same-sex related (LGBT) issues, I find it necessary to emphasize that Father Martin does not speak with authority on behalf of the Church, and to caution the faithful about some of his statements." Archbishop Chaput has also described many of the attacks against Martin as "bitterness" that is "unjust and unwarranted," while still calling for "serious, legitimate criticism" of the book's "perceived ambiguities" and inadequacies. Chaput argued that dealing with the substantive issues frankly "is the only way an honest discussion can be had." In 2019 Chaput again criticized the "bitter personal attacks" that have been made against Martin, calling them "inexcusable and unChristian."  While stating that many of Martin's efforts to accompany and support people with same-sex attraction have been laudable, Chaput also criticized Martin for "a pattern of ambiguity in his teachings," and for asking the Church to modify its teaching that same-sex attraction is "objectively disordered." Chaput stated: "The suggestion that the wisdom of the Church, rooted in the Word of God and centuries of human experience, is somehow cruel or misguided does grave harm to her mission." Martin replied that same-sex relations and same-sex marriage "are both impermissible (and immoral) under Church teaching," and that the reason he does not focus on this "is that LGBT Catholics have heard this repeatedly." Bishop Thomas Paprocki and Bishop Richard Stika supported Chaput's column. Bishop Paprocki described Martin's attitude as "deeply scandalous in the sense of leading people to believe that wrongful behavior is not sinful."

Martin addressed the Association of Catholic Colleges and Universities (ACCU), with over three-fourths of the Associations' school presidents in attendance, urging them to take steps to promote inclusion. Rev. Dennis H. Holtschneider, president of the ACCU, remarked that Martin was warmly received by "a new generation of Catholic college presidents" who reflect "the influence of Pope Francis". But J.D. Flynn, editor-in-chief of Catholic News Agency, contended that Martin presented in his address a "vision of the human person at odds with Catholic teaching". Flynn wrote that "every initiative" recommended by Martin, such as "Lavender graduation" or "L.G.B.T spiritualities, theologies, liturgies and safe spaces", was designed "to affirm the lie that sexual inclination or orientation is, in itself, identity".

Relationship with the Vatican
In 2017, Pope Francis appointed Martin as a consultant to the Vatican's Dicastery for Communication.

On August 23, 2018, Martin delivered an address at the Vatican's World Meeting of Families in Dublin, Ireland. His talk focused on how Catholics can more effectively engage with LGBT members of their communities, using biblical examples of Jesus interacting with the Samaritan woman and Zacchaeus to illustrate the call to inclusive community.

On September 30, 2019, Martin was received by Pope Francis in a private audience in the papal library of the Vatican's Apostolic Palace.

In June 2021, Martin received a handwritten letter in which Pope Francis praised Martin, writing how, "Thinking about your pastoral work, I see that you are continually seeking to imitate this style of God".

In May 2022 Martin sent three questions to the Pope about the relation of the LGBT community with the Church. The Pope answered the three questions.

In June 2022 Martin was a participant at the 2022 Outreach LGBTQ Catholic Ministry Conference held at Fordham University, a conference dedicated to outreach and dialogue with LGBTQ Catholics. Martin wrote a letter to Pope Francis informing him of the outcome of the conference. In July 2022 Pope Francis issued a letter in response encouraging Catholics to foster a "culture of encounter" that "shortens distances and enriches us with differences, in the same manner as Jesus, who made himself close to everyone." The Pope also assured Father Martin of his prayers, and invoked the blessing of Jesus upon him and the protection of the Blessed Virgin.

Views on denial of Communion to politicians 
In 2019, Martin criticized the public denials of Holy Communion to several politicians, including Joe Biden, based on their support for abortion, and to a woman who had contracted a same-sex civil marriage in the Diocese of Grand Rapids. Martin wrote in a tweet that denying Communion to politicians was a "bad idea" because in this case one "must also deny it to those who support the death penalty". Several Catholic authors and priests criticized Martin's interpretation of canon 915 which forbids the administration of Holy Communion to those who persist in manifest grave sin. Regarding same-sex marriage as public grave sin, Martin argued that there were "many other examples of public acts well known among parish communities."

Awards
Martin's book My Life with the Saints (2006) was the winner of a 2007 Christopher Award.

In May 2007, he received an honorary Doctor of Divinity degree from Wagner College on Staten Island, New York.

In May 2012, Martin served as commencement speaker at St. Joseph's University in Philadelphia, Saint Louis University in St. Louis, and Immaculata University in Immaculata, Pennsylvania.  He received an honorary degree from each school as well.

In May 2014, Martin served as commencement speaker at Marquette University in Milwaukee, Wisconsin, and received an honorary degree of Doctor of Letters.

In November 2015, Martin was awarded an honorary doctorate in divinity from Regis College, the Jesuit theological college within Toronto School of Theology.

As of October 2021, Martin serves on the Board of Directors of Georgetown University.

Publications

Books authored
This Our Exile: A Spiritual Journey with the Refugees of East Africa (Orbis Books, 1999), which tells of Martin's experiences in the early 1990s working with the Jesuit Refugee Service in Nairobi, Kenya, and helping East African refugees start small businesses.
In Good Company: The Fast Track from the Corporate World to Poverty, Chastity and Obedience (Sheed & Ward, 2000), which is the story of Martin's call to the priesthood and the early days of his Jesuit vocation.
Searching for God at Ground Zero (Sheed & Ward, 2002), which contains Martin's reflections on God, evil, love, and hope as he ministered to rescue workers at Ground Zero in the days following the terrorist attacks of September 11, 2001.
Becoming Who You Are: Insights on the True Self from Thomas Merton and Other Saints (Paulist Press, 2006) tells of the influence the writings of Catholic spiritual writers Thomas Merton and Henri Nouwen have had on Martin's life.
My Life with the Saints (Loyola Press., 2006), Martin's memoir, chronicling the lives of some Catholic saints and other holy men and women and how they have touched and guided his life.
Lourdes Diary: Seven Days at the Grotto of Massabieille (Loyola Press, 2006), an account of a pilgrimage to Lourdes.
A Jesuit Off-Broadway: Center Stage with Jesus, Judas, and Life's Big Questions (Loyola Press, 2007).
The Jesuit Guide to (Almost) Everything: A Spirituality for Real Life (Harper One, 2010), Martin explains how Jesuit founder St. Ignatius of Loyola helps people with practical spirituality.
Between Heaven and Mirth: Why Joy, Humor, and Laughter Are at the Heart of the Spiritual Life (HarperOne 2011) looks at the connection and relationship between humor, joy, and faith.
Jesus: A Pilgrimage (HarperOne, 2014): Martin describes his personal travels in the Holy Land, expounds on Bible passages associated with the sites that he visited during his travels, and relates the passages to current life. 
Seven Last Words: An Invitation to a Deeper Friendship with Jesus (HarperOne, 2016) Offers a portrait of Jesus, using his last words on the cross to reveal how deeply he understood our predicaments, what it means to be fully human, and why we can turn to Christ completely, in mind, heart, and soul.
The Abbey: A Story of Discovery (HarperOne, 2016) A novel about how God works in our lives. The protagonists discover the power of God to bring healing and wholeness to our lives.
Building a Bridge: How the Catholic Church and the LGBT Community Can Enter into a Relationship of Respect, Compassion, and Sensitivity (HarperOne, 2017).
Learning to Pray: A Guide for Everyone (HarperOne, 2021)

Books edited
How Can I Find God? The Famous and Not-So-Famous Consider the Quintessential Question (Triumph Books, 1997).
Professions of Faith: Living and Working as a Catholic (with Jeremy Langford) (Sheed & Ward, 2002).
Awake My Soul: Contemporary Catholics on Traditional Devotions (Loyola Press, 2004).
Celebrating Good Liturgy:  A Guide to the Ministries of the Mass (Loyola Press, 2005).

References

External links

Profile on America magazine website

20th-century American Jesuits
21st-century American Jesuits
Living people
American spiritual writers
American humanitarians
Clergy from Philadelphia
Writers from Philadelphia
1960 births
American magazine editors
Wharton School of the University of Pennsylvania alumni
Boston College School of Theology and Ministry alumni
American Roman Catholic religious writers
American LGBT rights activists
American Catholics
American clergy
LGBT and Catholicism